The Fergus Falls Wetland Management District is a protected area in the U.S. state of Minnesota.  It was established in 1962 with the initiation of the Accelerated Small Wetlands Acquisition Program. It is located in west central Minnesota and includes the counties of Douglas, Grant, Otter Tail, Wadena and Wilkin.

The mission of the district is to identify, protect, and restore the tallgrass prairie/wetland ecosystem and associated habitats and to provide opportunities for outdoor recreation and environmental education. For this purpose, the district currently manages 216 waterfowl production areas totaling , and 1,148 perpetual easements protecting  of wetlands on private land. Thirty-nine perpetual wildlife habitat easements covering  of wetland and grassland habitats on private land have also been obtained.

In addition the District manages the Prairie Wetlands Learning Center which has innovative environmental education programs and a wide array of visitor opportunities all focused on understanding prairie wetlands and grasslands.

References
District website

External link

National Wildlife Refuges in Minnesota
Protected areas of Douglas County, Minnesota
Protected areas of Grant County, Minnesota
Protected areas of Otter Tail County, Minnesota
Protected areas of Wadena County, Minnesota
Protected areas of Wilkin County, Minnesota
Protected areas established in 1962
Wetlands of Minnesota
Landforms of Douglas County, Minnesota
Landforms of Grant County, Minnesota
Landforms of Otter Tail County, Minnesota
Landforms of Wadena County, Minnesota
Landforms of Wilkin County, Minnesota
1962 establishments in Minnesota